Canoe Creek may refer to:

 Canoe Creek (volcano), a volcano in British Columbia
 Canoe Creek (British Columbia), a tributary of the Fraser River in the Cariboo region of British Columbia
 Canoe Creek Band/Dog Creek Indian Band, aka the Canoe Creek Indian Band, a band government of the Secwepemc people in the area of Canoe Creek
 Canoe Creek Indian Reserve No. 1 an Indian Reserve of the Canoe Creek Band/Dog Creek Indian Band in the Cariboo region of British Columbia, Canada
 Canoe Creek Indian Reserve No. 2 an Indian Reserve of the Canoe Creek Band/Dog Creek Indian Band in the Cariboo region of British Columbia, Canada
 Canoe Creek Indian Reserve No. 3 an Indian Reserve of the Canoe Creek Band/Dog Creek Indian Band in the Cariboo region of British Columbia, Canada
 Canoe Creek, Ontario, in Parry Sound District, Ontario
 Canoe Creek (Upper Iowa River), a tributary of the Upper Iowa River
 Canoe Creek State Park, a state park in Pennsylvania, USA
 Canoe Creek, Pennsylvania, a populated place near Canoe Creek State Park